Lega Liguria, whose complete name is , is a regionalist political party active in Liguria. Established in 1987, it was one of the founding "national" sections of Lega Nord (LN) in 1991 and has been the regional section of Lega per Salvini Premier (LSP) in Liguria since 2020.

Since 2015 Edoardo Rixi has been the party's leader.

History
The party was founded in 1987 by Bruno Ravera as Ligurian Union (Uniun Ligure). It participated to the 1989 European Parliament election as part of the coalition Lega Lombarda – Alleanza Nord. In 1989–1990 it took part in the process of federating the Northern regionalist parties, ahead of the regional elections. In February 1991 it was one of the founding members of Lega Nord, taking the current name, and since then it has been the "national" section of that party in Liguria. At the 1992 general election the LNL obtained 14.3% of the vote in Liguria, making it one of the early strongholds of the LN.

The LNL played a big role in party politics since the beginning. In 1993 Maurizio Balocchi was appointed federal administrative secretary (i.e. treasurer). In February 2010, after the sudden death of Balocchi, Francesco Belsito, Ligurian and close aide of Balocchi, was appointed in his place. The LNL has also been represented in Silvio Berlusconi's governments by Sergio Cappelli (1994–1995), Balocchi (2001–2006, 2008–2010), Belsito (2010–2012), and Sonia Viale (2010–2012).

Over the years, the party suffered several splits, including one led by Ravera, who was welcomed back in 1998 and appointed "president for life". In 2001 a group of keen separatists led by Vincenzo Matteucci formed the Ligurian Independentist Movement (MIL).

In the 2010 regional election the LNL gained 10.2% of the vote and three regional councillors.

In April 2012 Belsito was charged of money-laundering, embezzlement and fraud at the expenses of the federal party and was thus expelled. Being Belsito a Ligurian, the scandal hit the LNL and its leadership. Francesco Bruzzone, who had been secretary since 1998, decided to step down after that he was asked to do so by leading members of the party. Viale secured the support of 80% of delegates (115 votes) in a party congress, against the 20% (28) of her opponent Giacomo Chiappori, and was elected in his place, while Bruzzone was elected president and Andrea Corrado, who had been president since 1992, honorary president.

In the 2015 regional election the LNL obtained its best result ever with 20.3% of the vote and was instrumental for the election of Forza Italia's Giovanni Toti as President of Liguria. In fact, the LNL had renounced to run its own candidate, Edoardo Rixi, in favour of Toti in the run-up of the election and won almost twice the votes of Forza Italia in the election itself. As a result, the LNL returned to participate in the regional government, led by its leader Viale, who was appointed Vice President and minister of Health by Toti, while Rixi minister of Economic Development. Contextually, Bruzzone was elected President of the Regional Council.

In December 2015, during a national congress, Rixi (144 votes, 61% of the total) beat and succeeded to Viale (83) as secretary.

In the 2018 general election the party confirmed its strength in Liguria with 19.9% of the vote.

Popular support
Lega Nord Liguria has suffered a steady decline in term of votes since 1992 (when it obtained 14.3% at the regional level), but has recently re-gained strength and reached 20.3% in the 2015 regional election, its best result until that moment. The party is usually stronger in the western part of the region, indeed in the latest election it got 22.7% of the vote in the Province of Imperia, 24.4% in Savona, 18.7% in Genoa and 18.5% in La Spezia.

The electoral results of Lega Nord Liguria in the region are shown in the tables below.

Leadership
Secretary: Bruno Ravera (1987–1994), Giacomo Chiappori (1994–1998), Francesco Bruzzone (1998–2012), Sonia Viale (2012–2015), Edoardo Rixi (2015–present)
President: Andrea Corrado (1992–2012), Francesco Bruzzone (2012–2020)
President for life: Bruno Ravera (1998–2017)
Honorary President: Andrea Corrado (2012–2018)

External links
Official website

References

1989 establishments in Italy
Federalist parties in Italy
Lega Nord
Political parties established in 1989
Political parties in Liguria